Bernard L. McNamee is a government official who served as Commissioner of the Federal Energy Regulatory Commission from 2018 to 2020. McNamee was confirmed by the United States Senate as a member of the Federal Energy Regulatory Commission on December 6, 2018. He previously served in various state and federal legal and policy positions and practiced energy law in the private sector.

Career 
McNamee was a member of the Federal Energy Regulatory Commission (FERC), regional transmission organizations (RTOs) and independent system operators (ISOs); he also works with private equity investors and portfolio companies in understanding the complications of their investments involving federal and state level energy policy. Before joining the Federal Energy Regulatory Commission, McNamee served in the U.S. Department of Energy as executive director of the Office of Policy and deputy general counsel for energy policy. McNamee was also a policy advisor for a Senator from Texas as well as a Governor of Virginia.

Federal Energy Regulatory Commission 
While as commissioner of the Federal Energy Regulatory Commission (FERC), McNamee participated in over 1700 orders and approved the construction of numerous natural gas pipelines. McNamee helped with both cyber and physical security issues and standards leading them to conform with the North American Electric Reliability Corporation (NERC) regulations as well as the establishment of multiple hydroelectric facilities. While serving in the Texas Office of the Attorney General, McNamee led the Texas team in a multi-state effort in challenging EPA Clean Power Plan and Water of the United States.

McGuire Woods 
McNamee is a senior advisor at McguireWoods consulting. He has helped with obtaining permission from the Certificate of Public Convenience and Necessity (CPCN) to build three electric power plants and to convert three coal power plants to operate on biomass.

References

Living people
Trump administration personnel
21st-century American lawyers
1967 births
Emory University School of Law alumni